Sing In Japanese is a cover EP from punk rock supergroup Me First and the Gimme Gimmes.  The album consists of covers from Japanese artists and groups.  It was released on September 13, 2011 in conjunction with the band's Japanese tour. It was recorded at the Foo Fighters’ 606 Studio, and this is the second EP in the band's series of "world EPs".

Track listing

Band
 Spike Slawson - vocals
 Chris Shiflett (a.k.a. Jake Jackson) - lead guitar
 Joey Cape - rhythm guitar
 Fat Mike - bass
 Dave Raun - drums

Additional musicians
 Brad Magers and Keith Douglas - trumpets on "Linda Linda"
 Toshiya Ohno, Yoshiki Suzuki, Kosuke Yamagishi and Yumiko Hoshi - gang vocals

References

Me First and the Gimme Gimmes EPs
2011 EPs
Fat Wreck Chords EPs